Artesia is a city in Eddy County, New Mexico, centered at the intersection of U.S. routes 82 and 285; the two highways serve as the city's Main Street and First Street, respectively. As of the 2010 census, the city population was 11,301.

History
The town assumed its present name in 1903, after the discovery of an artesian aquifer in the area; artesian wells for agriculture flourished in the area until the aquifer became significantly depleted in the 1920s. The city was officially incorporated in 1905. It is home to one of the two Strangite meeting places in the world.

Geography
Artesia is located in northern Eddy County. US 82 leads east  to Lovington and west  to Alamogordo, while US 285 leads north  to Roswell and south  to Carlsbad, the Eddy County seat.

Demographics

As of the census of 2000, 10,692 people, 4,080 households, and 2,896 families resided in the city. The population density was 1,341.3 people per square mile (518.0/km2). The 4,593 housing units averaged 576.2 per square mile (222.5/km2). The racial makeup of the city was 72.25% White, 1.54% Native American, 1.44% African American, 0.20% Asian, 0.15% Pacific Islander, 21.56% from other races, and 2.86% from two or more races. Hispanics or Latinos of any race were 44.98% of the population.

Of the 4,080 households, 36.7% had children under the age of 18 living with them, 52.8% were married couples living together, 14.2% had a female householder with no husband present, and 29.0% were not families. About 26.6% of all households were made up of individuals, and 13.0% had someone living alone who was 65 years of age or older. The average household size was 2.61 and the average family size was 3.15.

In the city, the population was distributed as 30.3% under the age of 18, 9.0% from 18 to 24, 25.5% from 25 to 44, 20.1% from 45 to 64, and 15.1% who were 65 years of age or older. The median age was 35 years. For every 100 females, there were 92.0 males. For every 100 females age 18 and over, there were 87.6 males.

The median income for a household in the city was $29,529, and for a family was $34,598. Males had a median income of $30,085 versus $19,566 for females. The per capita income for the city was $13,911. About 15.7% of families and 20.1% of the population were below the poverty line, including 24.8% of those under age 18 and 20.0% of those age 65 or over.

Economy

The principal economic activities which support Artesia are the oil and gas industry, agriculture, and dairy. Prominent local oil and gas businesses include Wilbanks Trucking Services, EOG Resources, Mack Energy Corporation, and Marbob Energy Corp. In the fall of 2010, Concho Resources acquired most of Marbob Energy Corp's assets for nearly $1.6 billion. HollyFrontier Corporation also operates the Navajo Refinery, the largest refinery in New Mexico, at the corner of 1st and Main Street.

Artesia is home to the former Abo Elementary School, identified by One Nation Underground as the first and most likely only public school which is entirely underground and equipped to function as a fallout shelter. The school, completed in 1962, had a concrete slab roof which served as the school's playground. It contained a large storage facility with room for supplies for 2000 people in the event of nuclear warfare. The building was listed on the National Register of Historic Places in 1999 and is located at 1802 W Centre Ave.

The city has one of the few residential training sites of the Federal Law Enforcement Training Centers, mostly for the United States Border Patrol, BIA Police, and the US Air Marshals. The center is located on the former campus of the College of Artesia, which operated from 1966 to 1971.

Artesia has a high-voltage direct current back-to-back station which connects the eastern and western electric grids in Eddy County. This tie, built by General Electric in 1983, can transfer a maximum power of 200 megawatts. The used voltage is 82 kV.

The Artesia Restaurant and Hotel is prominently featured as a location in the film The Man Who Fell to Earth starring David Bowie.

Edgar Mitchell, Apollo 14 astronaut and sixth man to walk on the Moon, identified Artesia as his "hometown".

Former American football player Landry Jones attended Artesia High School, where he led the football team to two consecutive Class 4A state championships

Immigration
Artesia was the site of the Artesia Detention Center, that was responsible for individuals entering the US illegally and going through proper dockets that are in compliance with current US immigration laws. This location had incidents of humanitarian issues, for example a US citizen child was detained and legal issues due to its remoteness and the extent of this immigration issue. It was closed in December 2014.

Education
Artesia is served by the Artesia Public School District with these schools:
 Artesia High School (grades 10–12)
 Artesia Junior High School (grades 8–9)
 Artesia Intermediate School (grades 6–7)
 Central Elementary School (grades 1–5)
 Hermosa Elementary School (grades 1–5)
 Roselawn Elementary School (grades 1–5)
 Yeso Elementary School (grades 1–5)
 Yucca Elementary School (grades 1–5)
 Grand Heights Early Child Ctr. (kindergarten)

The Artesia Bulldogs play in 5A football division and have won 30 state titles. This is the fourth most in the United States. Head Coach and Athletic Director Cooper Henderson, also a former player, has led the Bulldogs to 14 titles.

Notable people
 Vernon Asbill (born 1945), educator and former member of the New Mexico Senate
 Mack C. Chase (born 1931), oil and natural gas tycoon
 Candy Ezzell (born 1953), member of the New Mexico House of Representatives
 Tanner Gray (born 1999), National Hot Rod Association driver
 Ray Handley (born 1944), former New York Giants head coach
 Alexa Havins (born 1980), Daytime Emmy Award-winning television actress
 Landry Jones (born 1989), quarterback for Oklahoma Sooners and NFL's Pittsburgh Steelers
 Steve Jones (born 1958), professional golfer
 Cody Lambert (born 1961), professional rodeo cowboy
 Edgar Mitchell (born 1930), Astronaut who walked on the Moon during the 1971 Apollo 14 mission

Climate

References

External links

 
 Artesia Daily Press, local daily newspaper
 Artesia Chamber of Commerce
 Artesia School District

Cities in New Mexico
Cities in Eddy County, New Mexico
Micropolitan areas of New Mexico
Populated places established in 1905
1905 establishments in New Mexico Territory